Mydinae is a subfamily of mydas flies in the family Mydidae. There are about 12 genera and more than 120 described species in Mydinae.

Genera
These 12 genera belong to the subfamily Mydinae:

 Baliomydas Wilcox, Papavero and Pimentel, 1989
 Ceriomydas Wilcox, Papavero and Pimentel, 1989
 Chrysomydas Wilcox, Papavero and Pimentel, 1989
 Dolichogaster Wilcox, Papavero and Pimentel, 1989
 Gauromydas Wilcox, Papavero and Pimentel, 1989
 Mapinguari Wilcox, Papavero and Pimentel, 1989
 Messiasia d'Andretta, 1951
 Mydas Fabricius, 1794
 Phyllomydas Bigot, 1880
 Protomydas Wilcox, Papavero and Pimentel, 1989
 Stratiomydas Wilcox & Pimentel, 1989
 Utinga Wilcox, Papavero and Pimentel, 1989

References

Further reading

External links

 

Mydidae
Brachycera subfamilies